Ardozyga cryptosperma is a species of moth in the family Gelechiidae. It was described by Edward Meyrick in 1921. It is found in Australia, where it has been recorded from Victoria.

The forewings are dark fuscous. The stigmata are represented each by a whitish speck surrounded with somewhat darker suffusion, the plical somewhat beyond the first discal. There is an almost marginal series of whitish dots around the posterior third of the costa and termen. The hindwings are grey.

References

Ardozyga
Moths described in 1921
Moths of Australia